General elections were held in Liechtenstein on 25 March 1962. The Progressive Citizens' Party won eight of the 15 seats in the Landtag, but remained in coalition with the Patriotic Union. This was the first election contested by the Christian Social Party.

Results

By electoral district

References

Liechtenstein
1962 in Liechtenstein
Elections in Liechtenstein
March 1962 events in Europe